Mikheil Bobokhidze (born 23 November 1981) is a Georgian professional football player. Currently, he plays for FC Sioni Bolnisi.

External links
 Career summary by playerhistory.com

1981 births
Living people
Footballers from Georgia (country)
Georgia (country) international footballers
Erovnuli Liga players
FC Dinamo Tbilisi players
Association football forwards